A Woman Branded or Dangers of Love (German: Gefahren der Liebe) is a 1931 German drama film directed by Eugen Thiele and starring Toni van Eyck, Elsa Bassermann and Hans Stüwe. It was shot at the Terra Studios in Berlin. The film's sets were designed by the art director Heinrich Richter.

Synopsis
After a young woman is raped she finds herself suffering from venereal disease. She takes revenge on the perpetrator by shooting him, before being forced to defend her actions in court.

Cast
 Toni van Eyck as Ilse Thorn 
 Elsa Bassermann as Frau Thorn, Ilses Mutter 
 Hans Stüwe as Dr. Kurt Rehmann - Ilses Verlobter 
 Albert Bassermann as Dr. Ringius, defense lawyer
 Hans Adalbert Schlettow as Verwalter Bodde 
 Kurt Lilien as Dr. Wendel 
 Veit Harlan as Ein Student 
 Karl Klebusch as Geheimrat Rehmann 
 S.O. Schoening as Professor Lehr 
 Karl Junge-Swinburne as Vorsitzender des Schwurgerichts 
 Kurt Ehrle as Prosecutor
 Ingolf Kuntze as Dr. Markow, prakt. Arzt 
 Rudolf Weinmann as Professor Winterfeldt 
 Ernst Hofmann as Assistenzarzt 
 Gustav Püttjer as Gefängniswärter 
 Charlotte Ziegler as Ilse Thorns Freundin

References

Bibliography
 Klaus, Ulrich J. Deutsche Tonfilme: Jahrgang 1931. Klaus-Archiv, 2006.
 Noack, Frank. Veit Harlan: The Life and Work of a Nazi Filmmaker. University Press of Kentucky, 2016.

External links

1931 films
1931 drama films
German drama films
Films of the Weimar Republic
1930s German-language films
Films directed by Eugen Thiele
Films about sexually transmitted diseases
Courtroom films
German films about revenge
German black-and-white films
Rape and revenge films
1930s German films
Films shot at Terra Studios